Dzhida may refer to:
Dzhida, Kyrgyzstan, a village in Osh Province, Kyrgyzstan
Dzhida, Russia, several rural localities in Russia
Dzhida (air base), an air base in Russia
Dzhida River, a river in the Republic of Buryatia, Russia, on which the town of Zakamensk stands